The Press Academy of Andhra Pradesh is a governmental institution to co-ordinate study and research in journalism, in Andhra Pradesh, India. It was founded on 24 February 1996. K.Srinivasa Reddy was the first chairman of the academy. By 2005, the academy had digitalised 16-lakh pages of newspapers, magazines, and periodicals published from pre-independence to post-independence, up to 1977. Devireddy Sreenath currently serves as the chairman of the academy who was appointed in 2019

References

External links

Journalism schools in India
Mass media in Andhra Pradesh
1996 establishments in Andhra Pradesh